Choi Yeon-Ho (born May 4, 1981) is a South Korean taekwondo practitioner.

He is a four-time world finweight (-54 kg) champion, and won gold in flyweight (-58 kg) at the 2006 World Cup Taekwondo. However, he has not participated in any Olympics yet, since South Korea does not send an athlete in the -58 kg class.

References

1981 births
Living people
South Korean male taekwondo practitioners
World Taekwondo Championships medalists
Asian Taekwondo Championships medalists
21st-century South Korean people